The Cross Straits, Hong Kong & Macau Football Competition for the Youth is an annual football competition co-organised by the Chinese Football Association, the Hong Kong Football Association, the Macau Football Association and the Chinese Taipei Football Association. It was first organized in 2011 in Wuhan, Hubei. Each year the four football associations will compete with each other in a chosen host city. The tournament is organised for under-16 group.

Past Results

References

      
Youth association football competitions for international teams
Annual sporting events in China
Youth football in China